The 1979 New York Mets season was the 18th season for the Mets, who played home games at Shea Stadium. Led by manager Joe Torre, the team had a 63–99 record and finished in sixth place in the National League's East Division. This was also the first season that the players names appeared on the back of the uniforms.

Offseason 
 October 2, 1978: Paul Siebert was traded by the Mets to the St. Louis Cardinals for Bob Coluccio.
 December 4, 1978: Bobby Brown was drafted by the Mets from the New York Yankees in the 1978 rule 5 draft.
 December 5, 1978: Tom Grieve and Kim Seaman were traded by the Mets to the St. Louis Cardinals for Pete Falcone.
 December 8, 1978: Jerry Koosman was traded by the Mets to the Minnesota Twins for a player to be named later and Greg Field (minors). The Minnesota Twins completed the trade by sending Jesse Orosco to the Mets on February 7, 1979.
 March 25, 1979: Bobby Brown was selected off waivers from the Mets by the Toronto Blue Jays.
 March 27, 1979: Nino Espinosa was traded by the Mets to the Philadelphia Phillies for Richie Hebner and José Moreno.

Regular season

Season standings

Record vs. opponents

Opening Day starters 
 Kelvin Chapman
 Doug Flynn
 Richie Hebner
 Steve Henderson
 Elliott Maddox
 Lee Mazzilli
 Willie Montañez
 John Stearns
 Craig Swan

Notable transactions 
 June 5, 1979: 1979 Major League Baseball Draft
Tim Leary was drafted by the Mets in the 1st round (2nd pick).
Ron Gardenhire was drafted by the Mets in the 6th round.
Dave Smith was drafted by the Mets in the 27th round.
Bill Mooneyham was drafted by the Mets in the 1st round (22nd pick) of the secondary phase, but did not sign.
 June 15, 1979: Bob Myrick and Mike Bruhert were traded by the Mets to the Texas Rangers for Dock Ellis.
 August 12, 1979: Willie Montañez was traded by the Mets to the Texas Rangers for two players to be named later. The Rangers sent Ed Lynch to the Mets on September 18 and Mike Jorgensen on October 23 to complete the deal.
 August 20, 1979: Ray Burris was selected off waivers by the Mets from the New York Yankees.
 September 21, 1979: Dock Ellis was purchased from the Mets by the Pittsburgh Pirates.

Roster

Player stats

Batting

Starters by position 
Note: Pos = Position; G = Games played; AB = At bats; H = Hits; Avg. = Batting average; HR = Home runs; RBI = Runs batted in

Other batters 
Note: G = Games played; AB = At bats; H = Hits; Avg. = Batting average; HR = Home runs; RBI = Runs batted in

Pitching

Starting pitchers 
Note: G = Games pitched; IP = Innings pitched; W = Wins; L = Losses; ERA = Earned run average; SO = Strikeouts

Other pitchers 
Note: G = Games pitched; IP = Innings pitched; W = Wins; L = Losses; ERA = Earned run average; SO = Strikeouts

Relief pitchers 
Note: G = Games pitched; W = Wins; L = Losses; SV = Saves; ERA = Earned run average; SO = Strikeouts

Farm system

Notes

References 
1979 New York Mets at Baseball Reference
1979 New York Mets team page at www.baseball-almanac.com

New York Mets seasons
New York Mets season
New York
1970s in Queens